Alarcón is a historic municipality in Castile-La Mancha, Spain

The surname Alarcón or Alarcon is of Spanish origin and may refer to:

Agustín Alarcón (born 1962), Spanish rower, brother of Bartolomé Alarcón
Alberto Alarcón (born 1986), Argentine footballer
Arthur Alarcón (1925–2015), American judge
Bartolomé Alarcón (born 1963), Spanish rower, brother of Agustín Alarcón
Daniel Alarcón (born 1977), Peruvian-American author
Enrique Alarcón (1917-1995), Spanish art director
Francisco Alarcón Estaba (born 1950), Venezuelan writer
Hernando de Alarcón, 16th Century navigator
Hugo Alarcón (1993-2019), Chilean footballer
Isaac Alarcón (born 1998), Mexican American football player
Isco, birth name Francisco Román Alarcón Suárez (born 1992), Spanish footballer
Jestoni Alarcon (born 1964), Filipino actor
Jorge Alarcón (born 1969), Mexican swimmer
José Alarcón (cyclist) (born 1988), Venezuelan cyclist
José Alarcón (footballer) (born 2005), Venezuelan footballer
José Alarcón (politician) (1878-1940), Spanish politician
José Alarcón Hernández (born 1945), Mexican politician
Juan Ruiz de Alarcón (-1639), Spanish dramatist
Julián Alarcón (1888-1957), Paraguayan composer and violinist
Laura Alarcón Rapu, Rapa Nui Chilean politician, Governor of Easter Island
Lucas Alarcón (born 2000), Chilean footballer
Manolo Alarcon de los Santos (born 1947), bishop of Virac, Philippines
Manuel Alarcón (1941-1998), Cuban baseball player
Mariana Alarcón (1986–2014), Argentine activist
Martín Alarcón (1928-1988), Argentine footballer
Martín Alarcón (athlete), Mexican long-distance runner
Miriam Alarcón (born 1993), Spanish sports archer
Nelly Garzón Alarcón (1932-2019), Colombian nurse, teacher
Norma Alarcón (born 1943), Chicana author and professor
Pedro Antonio de Alarcón, Spanish novelist 
Raúl Alarcón (born 1986), Spanish cyclist
Ricard Alarcón (born 1991), Spanish water polo player
Ricardo Alarcón (born 1937), Cuban politician, former president of the National Assembly of Cuba
Richard Alarcon (born 1953), member of the Los Angeles City Council and former member of the California State Senate
Tomás Alarcón (born 1999), Chilean footballer
Wilfredo Alarcón (1932-2010), Chilean catholic priest who survived torture and attempted execution by agents of the Pinochet dictatorship
Williams Alarcón (born 2000), Chilean footballer
Yosvany Alarcón (born 1984), Cuban baseball player